Ivor Griffiths (19 June 1918 – October 1993) was a Welsh footballer.

Griffiths made one appearance in The Football League for Chester in December 1946 in a 1–2 defeat at Rochdale. He had previously been with Tottenham Hotspur and he later joined Oswestry Town.

References

1918 births
1993 deaths
Sportspeople from Port Talbot
Welsh footballers
Association football wingers
English Football League players
Tottenham Hotspur F.C. players
Chester City F.C. players
Oswestry Town F.C. players